Fosnes is a former municipality in Trøndelag county, Norway. The municipality existed from 1838 until its dissolution in 2020 when it was merged into Namsos Municipality. It was part of the Namdalen region.  The administrative centre of the municipality was the village of Dun on the island of Jøa. Other villages include Salsnes and Nufsfjord.

At the time of its dissolution in 2020, the  municipality was the 199th largest by area out of the 422 municipalities in Norway. Fosnes was the 413th most populous municipality in Norway with a population of 618.

General information

Fosnes was established as a municipality in the old Nord-Trøndelag county on 1 January 1838 (see formannskapsdistrikt).  On 1 January 1871, the western district of Fosnes (population: 1,472) was separated to form the new municipality of Flatanger.  This left Fosnes with 2,655 residents.  On 1 January 1889, a small area of Fosnes (population: 61) was transferred to the neighboring municipality of Vikten.  Then on 1 January 1913, the western part of Fosnes (population: 1,631) was separated to form the new municipality of Otterøy.  This left the much smaller municipality with 1,107 residents.

During the 1960s, there were many municipal mergers across Norway due to the work of the Schei Committee. On 1 January 1964, the Finnanger area of Fosnes on the northern part of the island of Otterøya (population: 116) was transferred to the new municipality of Namsos.  In 2018, it became part of the new Trøndelag county which replaced the old Nord-Trøndelag county.

On 1 January 2020, Fosnes became a part of the neighboring Namsos Municipality. This happened because on 16 June 2016, the municipalities of Fosnes, Namsos, and Namdalseid voted to merge into a new, larger municipality as part of a large municipal reform across Norway.

Name
The municipality (originally the parish) is named after the old Fosnes farm, since the first Fosnes Church was built there (Fosnes Chapel is now located on the site). The first element is fólgsn which means "hiding place" and the last element is nes which means "headland".  (The first element is referring to an inlet behind the farm, where ships could not be seen from the main fjord.)  Historically, the name was spelled Fosnæs.

Coat of arms
The coat of arms was granted on 13 November 1992 and it was in use until 1 January 2020 when the municipality was merged into Namsos. The official blazon is "Or, a rowlock sable". This means the arms have a field (background) that has a tincture of Or which means it is commonly colored yellow, but if it is made out of metal, then gold is used. The charge is a oarlock from a rowing boat. The design was chosen to symbolize the importance of the sea for this coastal municipality where rowing boats were the main form of transportation in the former centuries. The arms were designed by Even Jarl Skoglund.

The first proposal for a coat of arms for Fosnes date back to 1989 when the municipal council launched a contest to develop a coat of arms. Several proposals were received, but none of them were acceptable to the council nor were they acceptable to the Norwegian Heraldry Society which determined the proposals were not made according to heraldic rules. Finally the Society proposed the current coat of arms, which was acceptable to the municipal council.

Churches
The Church of Norway had one parish within the municipality of Fosnes.  It was part of the Namdal prosti (deanery) in the Diocese of Nidaros.

Geography
Fosnes was a coastal municipality located along the Foldafjord, north of the town of Namsos. The municipality includes the island of Jøa, part of the island of Elvalandet, and part of the mainland.  The second deepest lake in Europe, Salvatnet, and the lake Mjosundvatnet are both located in the eastern part of the municipality.

Government

Municipal council
The municipal council of Fosnes was made up of 13 representatives that are elected to four year terms.  The party breakdown of the final municipal council was as follows:

Mayors
The mayors of Fosnes:

1838–1841: Peter Hersleb Graah Birkeland
1842–1843: Mathias Krog
1844–1845: Elias Bedsvåg 
1846–1847: O.H. Wedege 
1848–1849: Johan Peter Berg 
1850–1853: Elias Bedsvåg 
1854–1857: P.M. Aglen 
1858–1861: Elias Bedsvåg 
1862–1865: O. Soelberg 
1866–1870: Olaus Wedege
1871–1873: O. Soelberg  	
1874–1878: Emil Ellefsen  	
1879–1887: Andreas Hamnes  	
1888–1890: Peder Aglen (H)
1891–1901: Olaus Kjølstad (V)
1902–1905: Peder Aglen (H)
1908–1910: Olaus Kjølstad (V)
1911–1919: Brede Kvalstad (V)
1920–1922: Magnus Five 	
1923–1925: Brede Kvalstad (Bp)
1925-1925: Iver K. Hoff (Bp)
1926–1934: H.B. Bragstad (H)
1935–1937: Peter J. Devik (Bp)
1938–1941: H.B. Bragstad (H)
1942–1945: Sigurd Kvalstad (NS)
1945-1945: H.B. Bragstad (H)
1946–1947: Trygve Rørmark (Ap)
1947-1947: Aksel Strøm (V)
1948–1951: Trygve Duun (Bp)
1952–1955: Peder Stene (Ap)
1956–1957: Leiv Skrøvstad (Bp)
1958–1959: Torleiv Hoff (Bp)
1960–1963: Rolf Aarmo (Ap)
1964–1971: Håkon Bjøru (V)
1972–1979: Per Gansmo (Sp)
1980–1983: Agnar Moe (Sp)
1984–1995: Arne B. Skomsvold (Sp)
1995–2007: Kristen Dille (Sp)
2007–2015: Bjørg Tingstad (Sp)
2015–2019: Trygve Sandvik (Sp)

See also
List of former municipalities of Norway

References

External links

Municipal fact sheet from Statistics Norway 

 
Former municipalities of Norway
1838 establishments in Norway
2020 disestablishments in Norway
Namsos
Populated places disestablished in 2020